Ectoedemia hendrikseni is a moth of the family Nepticulidae. It is only known from a small area in the Provence region in southern France (the Estérel Massif in the Alpes-Maritimes and Var).

The wingspan is 6-6.8 mm. Adults are on wing from May to June. An individual record in October may represent a (partial) second generation or a late emerging specimen.

The larvae have been reared on Quercus suber. They mine the leaves of their host plant. The mine consists of a narrow, partly contorted gallery in the first half changes suddenly in a large blotch mine with two lateral bands of frass.

External links
Fauna Europaea
bladmineerders.nl
Western Palaearctic Ectoedemia (Zimmermannia) Hering and Ectoedemia Busck s. str. (Lepidoptera, Nepticulidae): five new species and new data on distribution, hostplants and recognition

Nepticulidae
Moths of Europe
Moths described in 2009